Bitter Heritage is a 1958 American TV movie directed by Paul Wendkos and starring Franchot Tone. It was originally written for Playhouse 90. The widow of Jesse James Jnr lodged an injunction with Screen Gems claiming invasion of privacy. The court turned down the injunction.

Premise
The story of Jesse James's peace-loving son and his uncle Frank.

Cast
 Franchot Tone as Frank James
 Elizabeth Montgomery as Mary Brecker
 James Drury as Jesse James, Jr.
 Henry Hull as Old Henry
 Eva Le Gallienne as Grandma James
 Dayton Lummis as Colonel Brecker
 Strother Martin as Earle Eheeler
 Robert Middleton as Luke Crocker
 Denver Pyle as Sam Wheeler
 Russell Thorson as Sheriff Piets

Reception
The Los Angeles Times called the show "a corker" with "superb" work from the cast.

References

External links
 

1958 television films
American television films
Western (genre) television films
Films directed by Paul Wendkos